Luke O'Loughlin (born 23 December 1985) is an Australian musician and former actor.

O'Loughlin was born in Adelaide, South Australia, to former model Tanya Powell of Tanya Powell Model Agency, and is a graduate of University Senior College.

O'Loughlin is best known as the star of the ABC children's TV show, Chuck Finn, where he played a Canadian child who moved to Australia where he discovers a paddle steamer occupied by ghosts.

In 2002, O'Loughlin won an Australian Film Institute Best Young Actor nomination for Escape of the Artful Dodger.

Currently O'Loughlin is the lead vocalist and keyboardist in the Australian band I Know Leopard,. He was formerly the lead vocalist of New Navy, and the drummer of the Sydney punk outfit These New South Whales.

O'Loughlin has also co-written with other artists, such as Foster The People and electronic duo The Knocks on their 2020 single ‘All About You’.

Growing up O'Loughlin listened to his parents’ ELO, 10cc and Alan Parsons Project records on repeat, which has inspired some of his work with I Know Leopard.

O'Loughlin was previously in a relationship with Rosie Fizgerald, the bassist from I Know Leopard.

Filmography

Film
 Sally Marshall Is Not an Alien (1999)
 The Road Ahead (2005)
Hair Today, Gone Tomorrow (2007)
The Boys are Back (2009)
Broken Hill(2009)

Television
 Chuck Finn (1999–2000) - Chuck
Escape of the Artful Dodger (2001) - Jack Dawkins / The Artful Dodger
Scooter:Secret Agent (2005)

Theatre 

 Equus (August 2003) - Alan Strang, performed at the Little Theatre, Adelaide

Music
 I Know Leopard
 New Navy
 These New South Whales

References

External links

1985 births
Australian people of Irish descent
Australian male film actors
Australian male television actors
Living people
Australian male child actors